Sidlow can be a surname and occasional given name. Notable people with the name include:

 Adam Sidlow (born 1987), English rugby league player
 Cyril Sidlow (1915–2005), Welsh footballer
 Edward Sidlow (born 1952), American professor
 J. Sidlow Baxter (1903–1999), Australian-born pastor and theologian in England